Ataba River is a river of northern Ethiopia and a tributary of the Tekezé River.

See also
 Rivers of Ethiopia

Atbarah River
Rivers of Ethiopia